The 2023 BAL season, also known as BAL Season 3, is the third season of the Basketball Africa League (BAL). The season began on 11 March 2023 and will end on 27 May 2023, with the playoffs and finals being played in the BK Arena in Kigali, which hosts the finals for a third season in a row. The regular season is played in Dakar, Senegal (Sahara Conference) and Cairo, Egypt (Nile Conference) for a second year in a row.

The qualification games for the season, the Road to BAL, began on 11 October 2022. The winners of the 2023 BAL season will automatically qualify for the 2023 FIBA Intercontinental Cup Singapore.

US Monastir are the defending champions, having won their first title in the previous season.

Qualification 

The first round of the qualifying stage consists of 20 teams that play in four groups of five, each held in different cities. In the Elite 16, the teams are joined by 6 teams that qualified during the previous 2022 BAL qualification. Two groups of five teams are played to determine the six teams that advance to the main tournament.

On 21 September 2021, FIBA Africa announced the 26 teams in the qualifying tournaments as well as the six countries that would qualify directly.

East Division

Group phase

Elite 16

Final round

East Division

Group phase

Elite 16

Final round

Teams
Petro de Luanda was the first team to qualify for the season when it won the Angolan League on 10 May 2022. The last qualifed team was City Oilers who captured the third place in the Road to BAL East Division on 27 November 2022. The twelve teams of the 2023 BAL season were officially confirmed on 13 February 2023. After an absence of a Nigerian representative in the 2022 season due to FIBA's punishment of the Nigeria Basketball Federation, Kwara Falcons was directly qualified as winners of the Nigerian Premier League.

Al Ahly, Kwara Falcons, ABC Fighters and Stade Malien will make their debut in the competition. ABC Fighters is the first team from Ivory Coast to play in the BAL, while City Oilers is the first team from Uganda.

Two teams, defending champions US Monastir and runners-up Petro de Luanda, appear in their third consecutive season.

Personnel and sponsorship 
Augustí Julbe of Al Ahly was the only coach this season to already have won a BAL championship, as he won the 2021 title with Zamalek.

Foreign and Elevate players 
Each BAL team was allowed to have four foreign players on its roster, including only two non-African players. Players in italics were signed only for the playoffs. If players have multiple nationalities, the nationality of an African nation is shown.

Each team also featured one player from the NBA Academy Africa, under the BAL Elevate program. The players were drafted in an online meeting by the teams and the official list were announced on 28 February 2023.

Pre-season 
The league hosted their official second BAL Combine on 15 and 16 January 2023 at The One Ball Training Center in Paris. The combine featured 30 players and was directed by former NBA head coach Quin Snyder.

US Monastir, as champions of the 2022 BAL season, participated in the 2023 FIBA Intercontinental Cup. It was the second time a BAL team participated in the FIBA Intercontinental Cup. In the competition, played in February and hosted in La Laguna in Spain, Monastir finished fourth after two losses against CB Canarias and Rio Grande Valley Vipers.

ESPN tipped Petro de Luanda, last year's runners-up, as the title favourites in their annual season preview.

Schedule 
The schedule for the 2023 season was officially released on 13 February 2023.

Regular season

Sahara Conference 

The games of the Sahara Conference will be played from 11 March to 21 March 2023 and will be played in the Dakar Arena in Dakar, Senegal.

Nile Conference 
The games of the Nile Conference will be played from 26 April to 6 May 2023 and will be played in the Hassan Moustafa Sports Hall in 6th of October, Cairo, Egypt.

Standings

Games

Playoffs 
The playoffs will be held from 21 May to 27 May 2023 in the BK Arena in Kigali, Rwanda for the third consecutive season.

Bracket

Quarterfinals

Semifinals

Third place game

Finals

References 

BAL
2022–23 in basketball leagues
Basketball Africa League seasons